Hibito (spelled variously Híbito, Hívito, Chibito, Ibito, Jibito, Xibita, Zibito) is an extinct language of Peru. It, together with Cholón, also extinct,  constituted the Hibito-Cholon family.

There were 500 speakers reported in 1850.

Loukotka (1968) reports that it was spoken along the Huamo River, just north of the Cholón area.

References

Indigenous languages of the Americas
Hibito–Cholon languages
Extinct languages of South America